Jaime Battiste  (born 1979) is a Canadian politician who was elected to represent the riding of Sydney—Victoria in the House of Commons of Canada as a member of the Liberal Party in the 2019 Canadian federal election. He is the first Mi'kmaw Member of Parliament in Canada.

Early life and education
Battiste is the son of Chickasaw legal scholar James (Sákéj) Youngblood Henderson and Miꞌkmaq scholar Marie Battiste. Battiste is a graduate of Dalhousie Law School.

Battiste spent his formative years in Saskatoon, Saskatchewan, graduating from Evan Hardy Collegiate in 1997.

Political career
In April 2019, Battiste announced he was seeking the Liberal nomination in Sydney—Victoria for the 2019 federal election. He won the nomination on July 13, 2019.

In early October 2019 Battiste created controversy when comments he previously made on social media were reported. In 2012, Battiste tweeted: "Why do I assume every skinny Aboriginal girl is on crystal meth or pills?" In another, he made light of sexual assault, tweeting "five minutes in Cheers and I would accidently [sic] sexually assault a cougar … twice."

Battiste apologized for the comments. Liberal leader Justin Trudeau refused to remove him as the Liberal candidate.

On October 21, 2019, Battiste was elected as the Member of Parliament in Sydney—Victoria becoming the first Mi'kmaq Member of Parliament.

On December 3, 2021, Battiste was appointed Parliamentary Secretary to the Minister of Crown-Indigenous Relations.

Electoral record

References

External links

1979 births
Living people
21st-century First Nations people
Chickasaw people
Indigenous Members of the House of Commons of Canada
Lawyers in Nova Scotia
Liberal Party of Canada MPs
Members of the House of Commons of Canada from Nova Scotia
Mi'kmaq people
Schulich School of Law alumni